Milton is a village in Pike County, Illinois, United States. The population was 271 at the 2010 census, a decline from 274 in 2000.

History
Charles E. Bolin (1843–1924), Illinois state representative and businessman, lived in Milton.

Geography
Milton is located at  (39.564226, -90.648769).

Demographics

As of the census of 2000, there were 274 people, 107 households, and 77 families residing in the village. The racial makeup of the village was 100.00% White. Hispanic or Latino of any race were 0.36% of the population.

There were 107 households, out of which 33.6% had children under the age of 18 living with them, 56.1% were married couples living together, 11.2% had a female householder with no husband present, and 28.0% were non-families. 25.2% of all households were made up of individuals, and 13.1% had someone living alone who was 65 years of age or older. The average household size was 2.47 and the average family size was 2.95.

In the village, the population was spread out, with 25.5% under the age of 18, 9.5% from 18 to 24, 29.2% from 25 to 44, 16.4% from 45 to 64, and 19.3% who were 65 years of age or older. The median age was 34 years. For every 100 females, there were 74.5 males. For every 100 females age 18 and over, there were 74.4 males.

The median income for a household in the village was $26,591, and the median income for a family was $28,333. Males had a median income of $26,786 versus $18,281 for females. The per capita income for the village was $11,847. About 10.8% of families and 10.0% of the population were below the poverty line, including 13.9% of those under the age of eighteen and 3.2% of those sixty five or over.

References

Villages in Pike County, Illinois
Villages in Illinois